Sailing at the 2000 Summer Paralympics consisted of two mixed events.

Medal summary

Results

One Person Keelboat - 2.4 Metre

Open Three-Person Keelboat - Sonar

Medal table

References 

 

2000 Summer Paralympics events
2000
Paralympics
Sailing competitions in Australia